Carrazedo is a civil parish in the municipality of Amares, Portugal. The population in 2011 was 732, in an area of 2.71 km².

References

Freguesias of Amares